Un mari à prix fixe is a 1965 French film directed by Claude de Givray and starring Anna Karina.

Cast
 Anna Karina as Béatrice Reinhoff
 Roger Hanin as Romain de Brétigny
 Gabrielle Dorziat as Mme Reinhoff, the mother
 Hubert Noël as Norbert Besson
 Gregor von Rezzori as Konrad Reinhoff
 Marcel Charvey as Me Luxeuil
 Guy d'Avout
 Christian de Tillière
 Henry Gicquel
 Max Montavon
 Michel Peyrelon
 Marcelle Tassencourt as Gertrude Luxeuil
 Colette Teissèdre as Jeanne
 Pierre Vernier as the beekeeper

References

External links

1965 films
1960s French-language films
French black-and-white films
Films directed by Claude de Givray
1960s French films